The 2016–17 Yale Bulldogs men's basketball team represented Yale University during the 2016–17 NCAA Division I men's basketball season. The Bulldogs, led by 18th-year head coach James Jones, played their home games at John J. Lee Amphitheater of the Payne Whitney Gymnasium in New Haven, Connecticut and were members of the Ivy League. They finished the season 18–11, 10–4 in Ivy League play to finish in third place. In the inaugural Ivy League tournament, they defeated Harvard before losing to Princeton in the championship game.

Previous season
The Bulldogs finished the 2015–16 season 23–7, 13–1 in Ivy League to win the Ivy League championship. They received the Ivy's automatic bid to the NCAA tournament, their first NCAA bid since 1962, where they defeated Baylor in the first round to advance to the second round where they lost to Duke.

Offseason

Departures

2016 recruiting class

2017 Recruiting class

Roster

Schedule and results

|-
!colspan=9 style=| Non-conference regular season

|-
!colspan=9 style=| Ivy League regular season

|-
!colspan=9 style=|Ivy League Men's tournament

|-

Rankings

References

Yale Bulldogs men's basketball seasons
Yale
Yale Bulldogs
Yale Bulldogs